Yuri Dmitrievich Burago (born 1936) is a Russian mathematician.  He works in differential and convex geometry.

Education and career 

Burago studied at Leningrad University, where he obtained his Ph.D. and Habilitation degrees. His advisors were Victor Zalgaller and Aleksandr Aleksandrov.

Yuri is a creator (with his students Perelman and Petrunin, and M. Gromov) of what is known now as Alexandrov Geometry. Also brought geometric inequalities to the state of art.

Burago is the head of the Laboratory of Geometry and Topology that is part of the St. Petersburg Department of Steklov Institute of Mathematics. He took part in a report for the United States Civilian Research and Development Foundation for the Independent States of the former Soviet Union.

Works 
 
 

His other books and papers include:
 Geometry III: Theory of Surfaces (1992)
 Potential Theory and Function Theory for Irregular Regions (1969)
 Isoperimetric inequalities in the theory of surfaces of bounded external curvature (1970)

Students
He has advised Grigori Perelman, who solved the Poincaré conjecture, one of the seven Millennium Prize Problems. Burago was an advisor to Perelman during the latter's post-graduate research at St. Petersburg Department of Steklov Institute of Mathematics.

Footnotes

External links 
 Burago's page on the site of Steklov Mathematical Institute
 
 Yuri Dmitrievich Burago in the Oberwolfach Photo Collection

Soviet mathematicians
Geometers
Differential geometers
1936 births
Living people
Saint Petersburg State University alumni
20th-century Russian mathematicians
21st-century Russian mathematicians